The 2008 World Outdoor Bowls Championship women's triples was held at the Burnside Bowling Club in Christchurch, New Zealand, from 12 to 24 January 2008.

Sylvia Burns, Loraine Victor and Lorna Trigwell won the women's triples gold medal.

Section tables

Section A

Section B

Finals

Results

References

Bowls
Wom
World